Burnt Factory may refer to:

Burnt Factory, Virginia, an unincorporated community in Frederick County
Burnt Factory, West Virginia, an unincorporated community in Morgan County